Theodoros Degiannis (1926–2006) was a Greek admiral and chief of the Hellenic National Defence General Staff. He also served as the Minister of National Defence in the Caretaker Cabinet of Ioannis Grivas and in the Ecumenical Cabinet of Xenophon Zolotas. 

He was born in 1926 in Chalcis, Euboea. In 1948 he graduated from the Hellenic Naval Academy and later continued his studies in other academies, including taking the Senior Officers' War Course at the Royal Naval College, Greenwich. During the Greek military junta of 1967–74, he was opposed to the regime, like many Navy officers. In 1977 he was promoted to vice admiral. In January 1982 he was appointed as chief of the Hellenic National Defence General Staff by the government of Andreas Papandreou, as he was one of the officers considered most trustworthy by the newly elected government of PASOK. He held the post until December 1984. 

In October 1989 he became Minister for National Defence	in the Caretaker Cabinet of Ioannis Grivas. In February 1990 he became again Minister in the Ecumenical Cabinet of Xenophon Zolotas after a Cabinet reshuffle on 13 February 1990. 

He died in 2006. 

His brother was Ioannis Degiannis, the presiding judge at the Greek Junta Trials and member of parliament with PASOK. Another brother, Ioannis Degiannis, was also a naval officer and a leading member of the Prometheus II resistance organization during World War II.

References

1926 births
2006 deaths
Hellenic Navy admirals
Chiefs of the Hellenic National Defence General Staff
Ministers of National Defence of Greece
People from Chalcis